Van Genderen may refer to:

People
Olton van Genderen (1921–1990), Surinamese Deputy Prime Minister

Planets
 6751 van Genderen, a minor planet